Jack Everley Lake (20 July 1914 – 5 December 1977) was an Australian rules footballer who played with St Kilda in the Victorian Football League (VFL).

Notes

External links 

1914 births
1977 deaths
Australian rules footballers from Melbourne
St Kilda Football Club players
People from Prahran, Victoria